Presnel Kimpembe (born 13 August 1995) is a French professional footballer who plays as a centre-back for Ligue 1 club Paris Saint-Germain and the France national team. He was part of the France squad that won the 2018 FIFA World Cup.

Early years
Kimpembe was born in Beaumont-sur-Oise, France, to a Congolese father and a Haitian mother. He was named after his maternal grandfather.

Club career
Kimpembe made his professional debut for Paris Saint-Germain (PSG) on 17 October 2014 against Lens, replacing Thiago Motta after 76 minutes in a 3–1 away win. He made his UEFA Champions League debut on 14 February 2017, keeping a clean sheet in a 4–0 win against Barcelona.

On 12 February 2019, Kimpembe scored his first goal for PSG against Manchester United in an away match at Old Trafford, turning home at the far-post from an Ángel Di María corner in the 53rd minute. However, in the return leg at Parc des Princes in Paris, he jumped to block a shot from Diogo Dalot in injury time that was given as a penalty for handball after the referee consulted VAR. PSG went on to lose the match 3–1, and were subsequently knocked out due to the away goals rule.

On 11 July 2020, Kimpembe signed a contract extension with PSG, a deal lasting until 2024. In the 2019–20 UEFA Champions League, PSG went on to reach the final of the competition, losing 1–0 to Bayern Munich. Kimpembe participated in the match. On 3 January 2022, he scored his second goal for the club in a 4–0 Coupe de France win over Vannes. He also contributed an assist for a Kylian Mbappé goal. Kimpembe scored his first Ligue 1 goal in a 5–1 win away to Lille on 6 February 2022.

On 26 February 2023, Kimpembe was stretchered off the field after rupturing his achilles tendon in a win over rivals Marseille. The injury would require surgery and came just two weeks after his return from a hamstring injury that had sidelined him for three months.

International career
Kimpembe got his first call up to the senior France side after Eliaquim Mangala withdrew through injury for 2018 FIFA World Cup qualifiers against Bulgaria and Netherlands in October 2016. In January 2018, William Gallas, former Arsenal and Chelsea player said that Kimpembe is the future of the French team. Kimpembe finally made his first team debut on 27 March 2018, a year and a half after his first call-up, in a friendly against Russia. He came on for Ousmane Dembélé in the 72nd minute of a 3–1 away victory.

On 17 May 2018, he was called up to the 23 man French squad for the 2018 FIFA World Cup in Russia. Kimpembe won the World Cup with France in 2018, a tournament in which he played a total of 90 minutes, against Denmark in the group stage.

On 18 May 2021, he was called up to the 26-man French squad for the 2020 European Championships. He started in all four matches for France, playing in every minute of the tournament until their eventual defeat to Switzerland in the round of 16.

On 9 November 2022, he was named in the French squad for the 2022 FIFA World Cup in Qatar. On 14 November, he withdrew from the tournament with an injury and was replaced by Axel Disasi.

Personal life

In July 2018, Kimpembe's name featured in the hit Vegedream single Ramenez la coupe à la maison. The line featuring his name, ‘Maestro Kimpembe (x7)', earned him the nickname 'Maestro'.

Kimpembe provided the French voice acting for Spider-Man's enemy Scorpion in the 2018 Marvel film Spider-Man: Into the Spider-Verse.

In June 2020, Kimpembe began his own streetwear collection called PK3 Paris. On 1 November 2021, he launched an auction for objects belonging to sportspeople for which the profits would be given to Médecins Sans Frontières in order to help the Haitian people.

Career statistics

Club

International

Honours
Paris Saint-Germain
Ligue 1: 2014–15, 2015–16, 2017–18, 2018–19, 2019–20, 2021–22
Coupe de France: 2015–16, 2016–17, 2017–18, 2019–20
Coupe de la Ligue: 2015–16, 2016–17, 2017–18, 2019–20
Trophée des Champions: 2016, 2017, 2020, 2022
UEFA Champions League runner-up: 2019–20

France
FIFA World Cup: 2018
 UEFA Nations League: 2020–21

Individual
UNFP Ligue 1 Team of the Year: 2020–21

Orders
Knight of the Legion of Honour: 2018

References

External links

Profile at the Paris Saint-Germain F.C. website

1995 births
Living people
People from Beaumont-sur-Oise
Footballers from Val-d'Oise
Citizens of the Democratic Republic of the Congo through descent
Democratic Republic of the Congo footballers
Democratic Republic of the Congo under-20 international footballers
French footballers
France youth international footballers
France under-21 international footballers
France international footballers
Association football defenders
Paris Saint-Germain F.C. players
Championnat National 2 players
Ligue 1 players
2018 FIFA World Cup players
UEFA Euro 2020 players
FIFA World Cup-winning players
UEFA Nations League-winning players
Chevaliers of the Légion d'honneur
Black French sportspeople
Democratic Republic of the Congo people of Haitian descent
French sportspeople of Democratic Republic of the Congo descent
French sportspeople of Haitian descent